Hulme End railway station is a disused railway station in Staffordshire, England.

The station was the terminus of the  Leek and Manifold Valley Light Railway which ran  from  where it made a connection with the standard gauge Waterhouses branch line of the North Staffordshire Railway.

Opened in 1904, the station had a single platform and a small goods yard with two sidings laid out for the use of transporter wagons, with a section of standard gauge track at the end of each siding. The station was also the servicing and storage point for the line's locomotives and coaching stock with both a locomotive shed and a carriage shed being provided.

The line became part of the London, Midland and Scottish Railway in 1923  but the finances of the line were poor and the line closed in 1934.  After closure, the route's right of way was acquired by Staffordshire County Council and the station site at Hulme End became a car park.  The station building was retained and, now restored, is used as a visitor information centre.

It was sometimes referred to as Hulme End for Hartington. Although nearly two miles from Hartington. The village also had a station on the Ashbourne Line between Ashbourne and Buxton. This allowed passengers to transfer between Hartington for Buxton, Leek and Ashbourne.

References
Notes

Sources
 
 
 

Disused railway stations in Staffordshire
Former Leek and Manifold Light Railway stations
Railway stations in Great Britain opened in 1904
Railway stations in Great Britain closed in 1934